The 1872 United States presidential election in Mississippi took place on November 5, 1872, as part of the 1872 United States presidential election. Voters chose eight representatives, or electors to the Electoral College, who voted for president and vice president.

Mississippi voted for the Republican candidate, Ulysses S. Grant, over Liberal Republican candidate Horace Greeley. Grant won Mississippi by a margin of 26.96%.

Results

References

Mississippi
1872
1872 Mississippi elections